Blood Indian Creek Reservoir is a reservoir in Alberta. The hamlet of Big Stone is located on the northern end of the reservoir.

Lakes of Alberta
Special Area No. 3